Lord Marshal may refer to one of the following 

Lord Marshal of England
Earl Marischal
 Lord Marshal (Sweden) (Swedish: Lantmarskalk) was in Sweden before 1866 the presiding officer for the nobles in the Riksdag of the Estates
 That title was also used in the Grand Duchy of Finland by the presiding officer in the Finnish House of Nobility and as their speaker in the Diet
The chairman of the Estländische Ritterschaft in Estonia

In fiction 
The leader of the Necromonger army in The Chronicles of Riddick (franchise) universe
In the popular medieval literary conception, the Lord Marshal Sir Brastias was said to have served under King Arthur.

See also 
 Lord Marshall (disambiguation)
 Marshal (disambiguation)
 Marshal of Nobility (disambiguation)